EcoPeace Middle East, formerly Friends of the Earth Middle East (?–2014), is a regional environmental peacebuilding organization in the Middle East, bringing together Jordanians, Palestinians, and Israelis to create shared solutions for the most water-scarce region on the planet.

Name
EcoPeace was formed in 1994, bringing together Israelis, Palestinians, Egyptians and Jordanians in the wake of the Arab-Israeli peace processes of the 1990s. After joining the international Friends of the Earth network, EcoPeace became Friends of the Earth Middle East, but in 2014 it left the network, reverting to the initial name as EcoPeace Middle East.

Description
The people and wildlife of the region are dependent on many of the same natural resources. Shared surface and sub-surface freshwater basins, shared seas, common flora and fauna species and a shared air-shed are some of the characteristics that necessitate regional cooperation. As a tri-lateral organization that brings together Jordanian, Palestinian and Israeli environmentalists, EcoPeace's primary objective is the promotion of cooperative efforts to protect a shared environmental heritage. EcoPeace has offices in Amman, Ramallah, and Tel Aviv, employs around 50 staff and actively involves hundreds of volunteers.

Actions
EcoPeace publishes scientific and social research, spearheads national-level advocacy campaigns and engages in grassroots community development.

One of EcoPeace's major efforts is a regional advocacy project to promote discussion and sharing of water resources. Its efforts are focused on the rehabilitation of the Jordan River, Dead Sea, Mountain and Coastal Aquifers and fostering awareness about the regional impact of climate change. EcoPeace's focal program, the Good Water Neighbors project, engages residents of all ages, mayors and municipal representatives in twenty five communities throughout Israel, Palestine and Jordan in a united effort to rehabilitate the regions' shared water resources.

EcoPeace has taken a leading role in calling for action to save the Dead Sea, which may be in danger of drying up due to some environmental factors. Various groups and government officials from several countries say that a pipeline from the Red Sea is needed to save the Dead Sea. The pipe would pump 200 million cubic meters per year. Half of this would be desalinated for Jordanian consumption and half put into the Dead Sea. Some experts questioned this project. Hebrew University of Jerusalem Prof. Avner Adin said more studies were needed on the potential environmental impact.

Awards 
 Heroes of the Environment 2008 by Time magazine to EcoPeace's three co-directors: Gidon Bromberg (Israel), Munqeth Mehyar (Jordan) and Nader Al-Khateeb (Palestine)
 Skoll Award in 2009.
 2008 SEED Finalist Award
 Green Globe Award 2010 for the best Environmental Education project for its Good Water Neighbors project
 Onassis Prize for the Protection of the Environment.
 Outstanding Leadership Award 2011 by the International Development Committee (IDC) of the Association for Conflict Resolution (ACR)
Mount Zion Award for having significantly contributed to the understanding of the three Abrahamic religions, Judaism, Christianity and Islam, in Israel.

References

Further reading

External links 
 

1994 establishments in Jordan
Companies established in 1994
Environmental organizations based in Israel
Environment of Israel
Environmental organisations based in Jordan
Non-profit organisations based in Jordan
Environmental organizations based in the State of Palestine
Non-governmental organizations involved in the Israeli–Palestinian peace process